Bruggink is a surname. Notable people with the surname include:

Arnold Bruggink (born 1977), Dutch footballer
Eric G. Bruggink (born 1949), United States Court of Federal Claims judge
Gerard Bruggink, (1917–2005) Dutch air force pilot
Gert-Jan Bruggink (born 1981), Dutch equestrian